This is a list of all players that played for the Waverley Reds and later the Melbourne Reds between 1989 and 1999 in the Australian Baseball League.

 – A native born Australian, who played for the Waverley Baseball Club.
 – A native-born Australian.
 – Played with the Reds as a US import.

Pitchers

Hitters

See also
Melbourne Reds
Australian Baseball League (1989–99)
Waverley/Melbourne Reds top 10 statistics

Players
Melbourne sport-related lists
Lists of Australian sportspeople
Waverley